Christianshåb-70 is a sports club from Greenland based in Qasigiannguit. They compete in the Coca Cola GM.

Achievements 
Coca Cola GM: 1
Champion : 1979

External links
 Greenland Football Association Official website

Football clubs in Greenland
Association football clubs established in 1970
1970 establishments in Greenland